Cantonale elections to renew canton general councillors were held in France on 20 and 24 March 1994.

Electoral system

The cantonales elections use the same system as the regional or legislative elections. There is a 10% threshold (10% of registered voters) needed to proceed to the second round.

Change in control

From right to left

 Gironde
 Dordogne
 Réunion

From left to right

Creuse

National results

Sources

E-P

1994
1994 elections in France